WYAS (92.1 FM, La Estación de la Familia y Candelita7) is a radio station broadcasting a Spanish Religious format. Licensed to Luquillo, Puerto Rico, it serves the Puerto Rico area. The station is currently owned by La Estación de la Familia, Inc., and its licensee is held by Radio Sol 92 WZOL, Inc. WYAS is simulcasting on WYAS-FM1, licensed to Carolina, Puerto Rico.

External links

YAS
Radio stations established in 1976
1976 establishments in Puerto Rico
Luquillo, Puerto Rico